Rhodopteriana sidamoensis is a moth in the family Eupterotidae. It was described by Philippe Darge in 2013. It is found in Ethiopia.

References

Moths described in 2013
Janinae